Sven Hörstadius  (1898–1996) was a Swedish embryologist known for his work on sea urchin embryos.

He was responsible for an increased understanding of the neural crest.

Hörstadius studied under John Runnström at Stockholm University College and was awarded his Ph.D. in 1930. He was appointed professor of zoology at Uppsala University 1942, where he remained until his retirement in 1964, but continued to lecture as an emeritus. He was elected a member of the Royal Swedish Academy of Sciences in 1946 and of the Royal Society in 1952.

References

1898 births
1996 deaths
20th-century Swedish zoologists
Academic staff of Uppsala University
Members of the Royal Swedish Academy of Sciences
Foreign Members of the Royal Society
Burials at Uppsala old cemetery